The Dead Sucker River is a  tributary of the Blind Sucker River on the Upper Peninsula of Michigan in the United States. Via the Blind Sucker River, it is a tributary of Lake Superior.

See also
List of rivers of Michigan

References

Michigan  Streamflow Data from the USGS

Rivers of Michigan
Tributaries of Lake Superior